xCHM is a free and open-source GUI front-end for CHMLIB (a viewer for Microsoft Compressed HTML Help files). It compiles and runs on Linux, BSD, Mac OS X and Microsoft Windows. Pre-built binaries for Mac OS X and Microsoft Windows are usually available for download from the project's website.

References

External links
 

Technical communication
Free software programmed in C++
Free system software
Software that uses wxWidgets